Lunt Silversmiths was an American manufacturer of fine sterling, silver-plate and stainless steel flatware, holloware, and giftware established in 1902.

History
In 1902, George C. Lunt, an engraver in the A .F. Towle & Son company, bought the business and renamed it Rogers, Lunt and Bowlen Co.  The company has remained in the Lunt family hands since the founding.

In 1935, the name was changed to Lunt Silversmiths.

Lunt's Embassy Scroll pattern was chosen by the United States government as its official tableware in all U.S. embassies and consulates around the world.
 
In late 2009, the company sold its name and inventory to competitor Reed & Barton.

In early 2010, the company filed for bankruptcy protection and all remaining manufacturing & inventory assets at the Greenfield, Massachusetts factory were sold at auction.

References

External links
 
 George C. Lunt

American silversmiths
Companies based in Massachusetts
American companies established in 1902
1902 establishments in Massachusetts